The Porsche Carrera Cup Great Britain is a multi-event one-make motor racing series that takes place in the United Kingdom for the Porsche 911 GT3. Being the fastest and most successful single marque GT championship in the UK, the Carrera Cup is now entering its nineteenth season. With over 30.000 visitors attending the majority of the races and approximately 370.000 visitors over the duration of the season, the championship is fully integrated in the international Porsche Motorsport program. Notable drivers in the championship have been two-time Porsche Mobil 1 Supercup winner Richard Westbrook and Supercup race winner Damien Faulkner.

The series is currently shown live on ITV4 as part of the channel's coverage of BTCC race days.

History
The Porsche Carrera Cup Great Britain had its inaugural Season in 2003, and is since then held across England, Scotland and Ireland. The Championship features a mix of professional motor racing teams and privately funded drivers. The Drivers compete in identical 911 Carrera GT3 Cup Cars, that conform technical regulations for the championship and aim to put driver skills in the spotlight. Although the championship is primarily held across the UK, single races in Germany, France and Belgium had been included to the regular racing calendar in seasons 2011, 2014 and 2015. Notable drivers are 2015 Le Mans winner Nick Tandy, two-time Porsche Mobil 1 winner Richard Westbrook and Supercup race winner Damien Faulkner.

The Championship continues to be a prime support race to British Touring Car Championship and is featured on a 7-hour live coverage on ITV4  each race weekend. Teams, Drivers and sponsors benefit from the Porsche Carrera Cup GB being broadcast on live TV.

In 2006 Porsche introduced a Pro-Am racing class (PA) for non-professional race drivers, giving them a chance to elevate their passion and benchmark their skills on the best national stage possible. By introducing an all-new Rookie class in 2015, Porsche provides a helping hand for young sports car drivers to build a professional racing career. This new class is primarily for young professional race drivers, aged between 17 and 24, with no prior Carrera Cup experience. By operating in its own class, Rookies are also able to compete within one of the other championship categories. The first place wins up to £50.000, the second place wins £20.000 and the third place still wins £10.000. By competing in one of the other championship categories, Rookies are able to win even more money from their respective class.

Since introduced for the 2018 season. All drivers are competing in a flat-six, rear-engine 911 (Type 991.2) GT3 Cup Car, with 485bhp (361kW).
.

Scoring system

1 extra point for fastest lap in each race and 1 point for Pole Position in the first race of each meeting.

Champions

References

External links